Steven Cazzulino (born 1 February 1987) is an Australian cricketer. He played 13 first-class matches for Tasmania between 2010 and 2014.

References

External links
 

1987 births
Living people
Australian cricketers
Tasmania cricketers
Place of birth missing (living people)